Roshan Basheer is an Indian film actor, who appears in Telugu, Malayalam and Tamil language films.

Career
Roshan made his acting debut by playing one of the lead roles in the Malayalam coming-of-age film, Plus Two (2010). The relative commercial failure of the film saw Roshan play supporting roles in the coming years, including appearances in Banking Hours (2012), Tourist Home (2013) and Red Wine (2013). Roshan Basheer then portrayed the pivotal villainous character in Jeethu Joseph's successful Drishyam (2013), before being selected to reprise his role in the film's Telugu version Drushyam (2014) and then the Tamil version, Papanasam (2015) featuring Kamal Haasan.

Post the success of both film, Roshan Basheer appeared in further lead role in small-budget films including Kubera Rashi and Moondru Rasigargal.

Filmography

References

External links 
 

Living people
Place of birth missing (living people)
21st-century Indian actors
Male actors in Malayalam cinema
Male actors from Kozhikode
1991 births